Chima Anyaso  (born Chimaobi Desmond Anyaso) is a Nigerian entrepreneur, politician and hotelier popularly known for his foray in the Nigerian downstream oil and gas sector.

Early life and education
Anyaso had his undergraduate and post graduate education in the University of Lagos, where he earned a Bachelor of Science degree in English and a Master of Science degree in Management, respectively.

Politics 
In 2019 Anyaso won the party nomination to represent Bende Federal Constituency in Abia State, under the platform of the Peoples Democratic Party (PDP). However, he lost to All Progressives Congress (APC) candidate, Benjamin Kalu at the 2019 general elections.

See also
Ayo Sogunro
Japheth Omojuwa
Adebola Williams

References

Living people
Year of birth missing (living people)
University of Lagos alumni
Nigerian politicians
Igbo people
20th-century births